This is a list of British television related events from 2000.

Events

January
1 January 
2000 Today, the marathon 28-hour live broadcast to celebrate the dawn of the new millennium, ends at 1:30pm.
Launch of Castaway 2000 on BBC One, a reality television show billed as a bold experiment for the new millennium. Thirty-six men, women and children from the British public, are placed on Taransay for a year. Taransay is a remote Scottish island in the Outer Hebrides and the group must build a sustainable self-sufficient community. The programme ends on New Year's Day 2001.
Channel 4 airs The Biggest Breakfast Ever, an eight-hour overnight millennium special with Johnny Vaughan and Liza Tarbuck. The channel's New Year's Day schedule also includes a contemporary version of Cinderella starring Kathleen Turner.
ITV airs the final episode of Gladiators, the ending was dedicated to the LWT videotape editor Clayton Parker who died in a car accident at the age of 45 in February 1999.
2 January 
Provisional viewing figures suggest BBC One's millennium coverage was watched by 12.8 million viewers as the New Year was welcomed in at midnight, more than twice the usual audience for New Year television. ITV's coverage was seen by 4.1 million.
BBC One airs a millennium special of its garden makeover series Ground Force in which Alan Titchmarsh, Charlie Dimmock and Tommy Walsh travel to the South African village of Qunu to design and build a garden for the former President Nelson Mandela.
Sarah Lancashire returns to Coronation Street as Raquel Watts for a special one-off episode in which she is reunited with husband Curly (Kevin Kennedy). The episode is watched by an average of 17.5 million viewers, peaking at 18.6 million.
3 January – The highest rated UK programme of the year so far is recorded, an episode of Coronation Street that gets 18.96 million viewers.
6 January – Following a brief return to the series during 1999, Gillian Taylforth leaves her EastEnders role as Kathy Beale.
7 January 
The long-running BBC children's programme Blue Peter reunites two former presenting teams to dig up the time capsules they buried for the year 2000 in 1971 and 1984.
A brand new stop-motion animated series for preschoolers Yoho Ahoy is first broadcast on BBC One.
12 January – A police officer charged over the crash that left television presenter Sheena McDonald in hospital is acquitted following a hearing at Horseferry Road Magistrates' Court.
17 January – BBC Two begins a four-part adaptation of Gormenghast, Mervyn Peake's series of fantasy novels. The series, starring Jonathan Rhys Meyers is launched with a massive publicity campaign, but is panned by critics and loses 40% of its viewership by the third episode. Figures indicated that the first episode is watched by 4.2 million, a healthy audience for a BBC Two programme, but that by the third episode, aired on 31 January, has fallen to 2.5 million.
18 January 
ITV sports commentator Steve Smith is reprimanded by the Independent Television Commission for calling a French rugby player a "stroppy little frog" after he threw the ball at an opponent during a World Cup match between France and Fiji in October 1999.
Retired Naval Officer Peter Lee becomes the biggest winner to date on ITV's Who Wants to Be a Millionaire? after winning £500,000. He is also the first person to have the opportunity to answer the £1 million question which concerns the location of Durham County Cricket Club, but takes the money after being unsure of the answer. The show would have its first £1 million winner in November.
The BBC confirms that Danniella Westbrook will leave EastEnders for the second time in four years, her character, Sam Mitchell only having returned to the series in 1999.
19 January – Former Brookside actress Gabrielle Glaister is to join Coronation Street where she will play Debs Brownlow, the younger sister of Natalie Barnes (Denise Welch).
23 January – Helen Flanagan takes over the role of Coronation Street character Rosie Webster from Emma Collinge who had played Rosie since she was ten days old. Collinge left the series to devote more time to gymnastics. 
25 January – Fiona Bruce presents her first episode of Crimewatch alongside Nick Ross, following the murder of her predecessor Jill Dando.
27 January 
Channel 4's The 11 O'Clock Show is criticised by the Broadcasting Standards Commission for including a reference to murdered television presenter Jill Dando which would have caused "widespread public offence". Channel 4 says that the item which aired on 26 October 1999, was meant to be a criticism of the high cost of the murder investigation and the ratings war between BBC One and ITV.
BBC One broadcasts the final episode of Dinnerladies.
31 January – Carlton Kids ceases broadcasting after 14 months on the air.

February
1 February 
Greg Dyke takes over as Director-General of the BBC.
Carlton World ceases broadcasting after 14 months on the air. 
3 February – Joe Absolom makes his final EastEnders appearance in a dramatic storyline that sees his character, Matthew Rose get his revenge against Steve Owen after Rose was wrongly convicted of the manslaughter of Owen's girlfriend.
5 February – An episode of Casualty in which the character Amy Howard (played by Rebecca Wheatley) is persuaded to attend a singing audition. The song she performs, Stay with Me Baby is subsequently released as a single by Wheatley who had been a singer prior to her acting career.
7 February – Director-General of the BBC Greg Dyke launches his "Cut the Crap" initiative, a drive to cut red tape at the BBC. Staff are issued with yellow cards bearing the phrase "Cut the crap, make it happen" which they are encouraged to brandish at meetings if they feel inertia is getting in the way of creativity.
10 February – Coronation Street confirms that Jane Danson who plays Leanne Battersby will leave the soap later in the year.
11 February – Debut of Reach for the Moon on ITV, starring Lynda Bellingham. 
12 February – BBC One airs When Changing Rooms Met Ground Force, a crossover edition of its two popular design and makeover shows, Changing Rooms and Ground Force.
13 February – BBC Two airs Gimme Some Truth, a documentary featuring footage of John Lennon as he recorded his 1971 album Imagine.
15 February – BBC One airs a one-off quiz, A Question of EastEnders to celebrate the soap's 15th anniversary.
18 February – Kevin Pallister leaves Emmerdale as Graham Clark. 
19 February – EastEnders celebrates its 15th anniversary on BBC One.
23 February – The first episode of the children's drama Hero to Zero is broadcast on BBC One.
24 February – The Guardian reports that Australian soap Home and Away will move from ITV to Channel 5 after the latter paid £40 million for the broadcast rights. It is the first time the channel has poached a programme from its rival.
27 February – BBC One airs the first episode of Monarch of the Glen.
28 February – Having decided not to adopt the 1999 ITV generic look, Scottish and Grampian launch a new on-screen logo.

March
1 March – Carlton Select closes, with Carlton's two other channels, Carlton Cinema and Carlton Food Network expanding their broadcasting hours in the wake Carlton Select's demise. 
2 March – The axe falls on some EastEnders characters, including Ricky Butcher.
4 March – ITV broadcasts The Brit Awards 2000, hosted by Davina McCall.
5 March – Former Take That singer Gary Barlow makes his acting debut in the 150th episode of Heartbeat, playing a hitchhiker named Mike Shannon.
7 March – Coronation Street confirms that television presenter Naomi Russell will join the series to play factory worker Bobbi Lewis. 
11 March – ITV broadcasts The Lookalikes Agency. 
12 March – ITV airs the drama Hero of the Hour, starring Ross Kemp.
13 March – Debut of The Blind Date, a two-part ITV drama starring Zara Turner. 
15 March – ITV will scrap its afternoon showing of Home and Away from 27 March after losing the soap to Channel 5, but it will continue to air in the early evening slot.
16 March – The Britt Allcroft Company best known for producing the first five series of Thomas the Tank Engine & Friends acquires the rights to the long-running children's arts and crafts programme Art Attack and other works from The Media Merchants company run by the host of the series Neil Buchanan and Tim Edmunds.
17 March – To mark the re-release of Stanley Kubrick's 1971 film A Clockwork Orange, FilmFour airs Return of A Clockwork Orange, a documentary discussing the controversy surrounding the film. It is also shown the following day on Channel 4.
19 March – Debut of Seeing Red, an ITV drama based on the book of the same name by Coral Atkins and starring Sarah Lancashire and Richard Dillane.
21 March – Channel 5 broadcasts the network premiere of Metro, starring Eddie Murphy.
22 March – The House of Commons Culture, Media and Sport Committee issues a report calling on ITV to restore News at Ten after finding that the broadcaster has seen a drop in ratings since the programme was dropped in 1999.
24 March – Paul Loughran leaves Emmerdale after six years when his character Butch Dingle dies in a bus crash.
26 March – Debut of Doctors, BBC One's new daily serial set in a doctors' surgery. The first episode is broadcast at 6:35pm on a Sunday evening, before continuing on weekdays at 12:30pm. 
27 March – The BBC announces plans to establish an annual bursary at a college in Falmouth for students wishing to train in broadcast journalism as a "living tribute" to TV presenter Jill Dando.
28 March 
In its annual report, the Independent Television Commission praises Channel 5 for reducing the amount of "tacky" sex shows included in its scheduling, while 5 News and the channel's films and factual programming are also praised. However, the watchdog criticises the amount of low budget programming shown, particularly in the early hours of the morning. The ITC also has warm words for Channel 4, in particular for the "freshness and innovation" of its programming.
BBC Two's Spring and Summer season will see actor John Alford, jailed in 1999 for drug offences, make his return to television as a taxi passenger in a ten-minute short titled Talk Radio, it is reported. Other highlights include the comedy Coupling and Rhona, the first British sitcom about a lesbian.
29 March – The Broadcasting Standards Commission reprimands EastEnders for episodes screened in December 1999 that featured characters attending a stag and hen weekend in Amsterdam which showed drinking, drug taking and sexual innuendo. An episode of Goodness Gracious Me aired in February is also criticised for a sketch in which mango chutney was spread on communion bread, something that several viewers felt was disrespectful to the Eucharist.
30 March – UK Arena is renamed UK Drama.

April
3 April – BSkyB airs the first interactive TV advert for the cooking sauce Chicken Tonight. Viewers are offered the option of pushing the Red Button to visit Sky's interactive TV service Open where they can order a money-off voucher and a recipe book and to browse through recipes.
12 April – ITV broadcasts the second Pride of Britain Awards which attracts an audience of 10.2 million. The figures prove to be a surprise for the broadcaster and are higher than those achieved by the 2000 BRIT Awards which had 8.8 million viewers and the BAFTA Awards that aired on Sky One which had a viewership of 100,000.
14 April – Former MI5 Officer David Shayler who fled from the UK after passing secret documents to the Mail on Sunday , appears as a guest on Have I Got News for You. Because he faces arrest if he returns to the UK, his contribution is recorded via satellite from a studio in France which affected the timing of the comedy on that edition.
17 April 
A former researcher on The Vanessa Show wins libel damages against The Mirror newspaper after it published an article in February 1999 claiming she knew many of the guests she had hired for the show were fakes.
The shopping channel Ideal World is launched. 
20 April – After twelve years as Ricky Butcher, Sid Owen makes his final appearance in EastEnders where his character is seen leaving for Europe in a lorry.
28 April – Channel 4 confirms that Liza Tarbuck will leave The Big Breakfast to return to acting after the presenter broke the news on the programme's website. She will leave in August at the end of her year-long contract.
30 April – Guinness's 1999 Surfer advertisement is voted No. 1 in a poll of the top 100 greatest television adverts of all time in a show for Channel 4.

May
1 May 
ITV's Day of Promise, a series of special programmes throughout the day hosted by Eammon Holmes, Carol Vorderman and Danielle Nicholls. The day is part of a 12-month campaign in which people around Britain are asked to make a simple pledge to do something positive for the first year of the new millennium. Among the programmes aired that day include the first celebrity edition of Who Wants to Be a Millionaire?.
Formal broadcasting of pay-per-view (PPV) service ONrequest begins.
4 May – Coronation Street confirms that Charles Lawson who plays Jim McDonald, is to be written out of the series when his contract ends in October.
9 May – Durham University wins the 1999–2000 series of University Challenge, beating Oriel College, Oxford 325–135.
13 May 
Four senior television figures, Alastair Burnet, David Nicholas, Geoffrey Cox and Nigel Ryan have written to the Independent Television Commission accusing ITV of ruining its reputation by replacing News at Ten with "weak series, entertainment trivia and mildly pornographic programmes", it is reported.
Denmark's Olsen Brothers win the 2000 Eurovision Song Contest with Fly on the Wings of Love.
 17 May – The completion of NTL's purchase of Cable & Wireless’ cable assets takes place. two months after the sale was cleared by the Competition Commission.
18 May – The Independent Television Commission rejects proposals by ITV to improve promotion of its news bulletins and increase spending on evening programming. The broadcaster's nightly news bulletin has suffered a drop in ratings since News at Ten was axed last year.
20 May – Gary Mullen, performing as Freddie Mercury wins the eleventh series of Stars in Their Eyes.
22 May – Following a hearing at Inner London Crown Court, former Changing Rooms designer Liz Wagstaff is sentenced to twelve months imprisonment for deceiving friends and colleagues out of £54,000 by claiming she needed the money for specialist cancer treatment.
24 May – BBC Two airs a special edition of TOTP2 featuring performances from Bon Jovi.
30 May – Six cast members of ITV's The Bill are to leave the series, it is reported. They include Peter Ellis who plays Chief Superintendent Brownlow and Billy Murray who plays Detective Sergeant Don Beech.
May 
The licence to run Channel 5's teletext service is awarded to Teletext Ltd and is valid for ten years from 1 July 2002.
The BBC announce that Ainsley Harriott will succeed Fern Britton as the presenter of Ready Steady Cook.

June
2 June – Johnny Vaughan confirms he will step down as co-presenter of The Big Breakfast in early 2001.
4 June 
13-year-old Coronation Street character Sarah Platt (played by Tina O'Brien) gives birth to a baby daughter called Bethany, a storyline which intensifies a national public and media frenzy surrounding the topic of teenage pregnancy.
Marjorie Lang wins the 2000 series of MasterChef.
6 June – Channel 5 airs the one-off game show Naked Jungle as part of its Naturism Week. The show features presenter Keith Chegwin and contestants completing a number of puzzle-type tasks in a jungle environment. The programme sparks a debate about nudity on television and is mentioned in the House of Commons where Culture Secretary Chris Smith questions the quality of British television content.
8 June – After 11 years, Home and Away is shown on ITV for the final time. It returns on Channel 5 on 16 July 2001. The show's year-long absence occurs because of a clause in ITV's contract preventing it from being broadcast for at least a year after its ITV run ends.
10 June–2 July – Euro 2000 is held jointly by Belgium and the Netherlands.
15 June 
Patsy Palmer makes her post-EastEnders debut in one-off detective drama McCready and Daughter, while former Coronation Street actress Sarah Lancashire stars in the legal sitcom Chambers.
BBC Two airs a special edition of TOTP2 dedicated to ABBA.
20 June – A failure at a substation in Shepherd's Bush causes a power cut at BBC Television Centre and leads to major disruption to BBC television and radio services.
28 June – The Broadcasting Standards Commission upholds twelve viewer complaints about the London Weekend Television documentary Aircraft Emergencies which showed slow motion footage of air crashes against the backdrop of dramatic music. The Commission felt the programme was too voyeuristic and would have added to the distress of those involved in the incidents.
29 June – It is announced that Lisa Riley will leave her role as Emmerdales Mandy Dingle in the Autumn.

July
1 July – C-Day in the United Kingdom. From that day, most commercial broadcasters begin broadcasting adverts, promotions, and idents in 16:9 widescreen ratio.
3 July – ITV announce that Emmerdale will air five nights a week from the Autumn.
6 July – The first episode of the new police procedural drama Burnside is broadcast on ITV.
11 July – Eric Richard who plays the long-serving Sergeant Bob Cryer in The Bill is to leave the series, it is reported.
14 July – The reality show Big Brother debuts in the UK on Channel 4.
17 July – ITV launches a £500,000 advertising campaign fronted by Jerry Springer which was aimed at repositioning ITV2 as a general entertainment channel. When it launched in December 1998, the channel had promoted itself as a younger alternative to ITV.
20 July – The Independent Television Commission says it will issue a "legally binding" directive to ITV to move its 11pm news bulletin forward an hour if it does not restore News at Ten. The ITC have been concerned about the 11pm bulletin's low ratings.
22 July – The ten part popular culture series I Love the '70s debuts on BBC Two with I Love 1970 where each edition was dedicated to a different year of the decade, the series concludes on 23 September with I Love 1979.
27 July – ITV says it will apply for a High Court judicial review into the ITC's decision to order it to move its 11pm news bulletin.
28 July – BBC One introduces its daytime soap Doctors into the evening schedule with the first of seven weekly episodes planned to air in the Friday 7pm slot. The episodes are shown in that slot up to Friday 1 September, with the final episode of the run airing at 7:00pm on Thursday 7 September.

August
1 August – The ITN News Channel launches. It is a joint venture between ITN and NTL.
4 August – Liza Tarbuck presents her final edition of The Big Breakfast. Later that same day, it is confirmed that Denise van Outen will return to the show to co-host with Johnny Vaughan from 11 September until he leaves in early 2001.
6 August – The BBC are considering a reorganisation of their digital channels to replace BBC Choice and BBC Knowledge with BBC Three and BBC Four, it is reported. The new channels would launch in February 2003 and March 2002 respectively.
14 August _
The first episode of the game show The Weakest Link is broadcast on BBC Two, presented by Anne Robinson.
 The first episode of Ready Steady Cook was presented by Ainsley Harriott is broadcast on BBC Two. 
16 August – Sophie Long, an aspiring broadcast journalist from Weston-super-Mare is awarded the first Jill Dando bursary, it is reported. After later graduating from Falmouth College of Arts, she is taken on by the BBC.
17 August – Big Brother contestant Nick Bateman is evicted after attempting to influence voting on the reality show.
25 August – Delivering the annual MacTaggart Lecture at the Edinburgh International Television Festival, BBC Director-General Greg Dyke announces plans to move the BBC Nine O'Clock News to 10pm, ending the bulletin's 30-year run in the 9pm time slot. The change would take place in October. 
26 August – Ian Wright presents the pilot of This is My Moment, a singing talent show made by Granada Television. Members of the public were invited to call a premium-rate phoneline to audition for the show, 60 of whom were chosen to perform in front of a panel at Granada Studios. Of those, five were then selected to appear on the show. The public are encouraged to vote for their favourite act, with the number of calls determining the overall prize money.
28 August 
The BBC is to buy the Steven Spielberg produced World War II drama Band of Brothers, the most expensive television series made to date. It will air on BBC One in 2001.
The first episode of the countryside drama Down to Earth is broadcast on BBC One, starring Pauline Quirke and Warren Clarke. 
30 August 
EastEnders announces the arrival of the Slater family who will join the soap in mid-September as a replacement for the Di Marco family.
ITV announces plans to resurrect Crossroads with an updated format in 2001. The channel will also launch a London-based soap to rival EastEnders which is provisionally titled Trafalgar Road.

September
1–2 September – Sky One hosts a special weekend dedicated to celebrating the 10th anniversary of The Simpsons in the UK.
5 September – The BBC has given its permission for the Teletubbies to be used in promotional material for a controversial windfarm in Wales in order to help win over critics.
7 September – Gretchen Franklin makes her final EastEnders appearance as Ethel Skinner. The character is involved in a controversial euthanasia storyline after asking her friend Dot Cotton (June Brown) to help her end her life because she has terminal cancer.
11 September 
Granada Media plc agrees to acquire 45% of Irish commercial broadcaster TV3 from the channel's original consortium as part of a deal giving TV3 the right to simulcast programming with ITV.
BBC One airs Episode 2000 of EastEnders.
12 September 
As the fuel protests begin to affect motorists and businesses, Sky News introduces its news ticker and regular updates to keep viewers informed of events concerning the developing crisis. BBC News and ITV News begin regular updates the following day. Through the duration of the crisis, the rolling news channels see an increase in viewers, while audiences for bulletins on BBC One and ITV increase by as much as 50 percent, their highest since the Kosovo War.
Debut of Jailbreak, a reality show described as Channel 5's answer to Big Brother, in which contestants can win £100,000 by escaping from a mock prison. The three-week show, presented by Craig Charles, Ruth England and Charlie Stayt is criticised by prisoners' groups. Roberta Woodhouse, Hannah Davies and Laura Hawkins become the first contestants to escape on 23 September.
13 September – Peter Salmon, current Controller of BBC One is appointed the broadcaster's new Director of Sport.
14 September – Lorraine Heggessey is appointed Controller of BBC One, becoming the first woman to hold the post. She will take over from present Controller, Peter Salmon on 1 November.
15 September 
The first series of Big Brother is won by Craig Phillips. He announces that he will be giving his £70,000 prize to his friend Joanne Harris who has Down syndrome to pay for her heart and lung transplant.
After eleven years on the air, the final edition of Breakfast News is broadcast on BBC One.
15 September–1 October – The BBC broadcasts the 2000 Olympic Games with live coverage on BBC One from late evening until the following lunchtime. BBC Two provides alternative live mid-morning coverage during the first week.
18 September 
Launch of The Community Channel, a free-to-air television channel wholly owned by Media Trust and supported by major broadcasters including the BBC.
The Independent Television Commission rejects viewer complaints about Channel 5's Naked Jungle in which contestants and presenter Keith Chegwin were seen naked because it was aired after the watershed and did not breach decency regulations.
20 September – BBC Two airs a special 1970s edition of TOTP2.
21 September – ITV announces the return of News at Ten which will air on at least three nights a week from the New Year. The decision comes a week before a judicial review into the ITC's order for the bulletin to be restored was to be heard.
 23 September – The final edition of the Summer Saturday morning children's magazine show Fully Booked is broadcast. This brings to an end of an almost 20 year run of BBC1 Summer only Saturday morning children's magazine shows.
27 September – BBC Two airs a special edition of TOTP2 featuring the hits of John Lennon and presented by Yoko Ono.
30 September – BBC One airs a special gala concert paying tribute to Jill Dando, featuring some of her favourite artists. The concert was arranged to raise funds for the Jill Dando Institute, a crime science unit planned in her memory.
September–October – Jacky Rowland, the BBC News Foreign Correspondent in Yugoslavia is expelled from that country in the wake of the presidential election that saw Vojislav Koštunica defeat Slobodan Milošević for alleged biased reporting. However, it later emerged Rowland did not leave Yugoslavia, but stayed in hiding as events surrounding the overthrow of Slobodan Milošević unfolded before emerging to report on its conclusion.

October
1 October 
BBC One airs live coverage of the Closing Ceremony of the 2000 Olympic Games.
Return of Nick Cotton, an EastEnders spin-off episode airs featuring the character of Nick Cotton.
Channel 5's Jailbreak concludes after three weeks on the air.
Sky One airs Blackadder Back and Forth which is watched by 1.4 million viewers.
2 October 
Q TV a television music channel based on Q Magazine, is launched.
ITV soap Emmerdale begins airing five nights a week.
The first edition of the BBC's revamped breakfast news programme Breakfast is broadcast. The new programme is carried on both BBC One and BBC News 24. Previously, they had aired their own breakfast programme Breakfast 24.
3 October – The BBC confirms it will move its Nine O'Clock News to 10pm from 16 October to compete with ITV's relaunch of News at Ten. The announcement causes surprise as it had been expected the changes would take effect from October 2001. Politicians from all major political parties criticise the BBC's decision, fearing it will affect news quality.
4 October 
The Prince of Wales (now Charles III) joins several television personalities, including Gaby Roslin and Des Lynam to promote Loud Tie Day, a campaign to raise awareness of bowel cancer.
Comedy sketches involving abortion, dead babies and people with disabilities that appeared in episodes of Channel 4's Jam are criticised by the Broadcasting Standards Commission because they went "beyond acceptable boundaries in their treatment of issues of particular sensitivity which required greater respect for the vulnerability of those depicted".
5 October – The launch of bid-up.tv, later bid.tv.
7 October – The BBC Saturday morning children's entertainment series Live & Kicking is relaunched, featuring former Blue Peter presenter Katy Hill, Sarah Cawood, Ortis Deley and Trey Farley.
9 October 
US-Canadian science fiction television series Gene Roddenberry's Andromeda debuts on Sky One.
BBC One airs the Panorama documentary Who Bombed Omagh? which names individuals questioned by police over the 1998 Omagh bombing. The programme is praised by Northern Ireland Secretary Peter Mandelson as "a very powerful and very professional piece of work", but is criticised by Irish Taoiseach Bertie Ahern who warns that "bandying around names on television" could hinder attempts to secure convictions and First Minister David Trimble who says he has "very grave doubts" about it. The programme has also been the subject of legal action by Lawrence Rush whose wife Elizabeth died in the bombing and who sought an injunction to block it from being broadcast.
13 October – The flagship BBC One news programme the Nine O'Clock News ends after a run of 30 years after the BBC earlier announced that it was to move the bulletin to 10pm. The BBC News at Ten is launched on Monday 16 October. The change attracts criticism from both the National Consumer Council and the Culture Secretary Chris Smith. The BBC Nine O'Clock News also moves to its dedicated channel on the same day. ITV later announces its intention to reinstate News at Ten from January 2001.
16 October 
Oxfordshire, once part of the BBC's South East region, becomes part of South Today.
 The first BBC News at Ten is broadcast on BBC One. 
17 October – BBC One airs the network television premiere of Men in Black, starring Will Smith, Tommy Lee Jones, Linda Fiorentino, Vincent D'Onofrio and Rip Torn.
20 October – Have I Got News for You returns for a new series, moving from BBC Two to BBC One.
21 October 
Parkinson returns to BBC One for a new series as part of its Saturday night schedule, having previously aired on Fridays since its relaunch in 1998.
Helicopter pilot Duncan Bickley loses £218,000 on Who Wants to Be a Millionaire? after incorrectly answering the £500,000 question. Having reached £250,000 his winnings dropped back to £32,000 after he gave the wrong answer to a question about the name of the aircraft in which Amy Johnson flew solo to Australia in 1930.
26 October – 15-year-old Sonia Jackson, a character in EastEnders played by Natalie Cassidy, unexpectedly gives birth to a baby girl called Chloe which comes four months after ITV's Coronation Street ran a similar teenage pregnancy storyline.
28 October 
Footballer David Beckham appears on BBC One's Parkinson, telling the host that he plans to become "the best footballer in the world" while at Manchester United.
Channel 4 airs a season of horror films under the title FilmFear which includes Death Race 2000 and the British television premiere of The Texas Chain Saw Massacre, banned in the UK until 1999.
30 October 
Blockbusters debuts on Sky One for a second time, presented by Liza Tarbuck.
The League of Gentlemen embark on their first national stage tour, originally planning 14 dates but ending up completing 111. 
31 October – The Weakest Link makes its BBC One debut as part of the channel's evening schedule. Billed as the Champions' League, the series sees winning contestants from BBC Two's daytime version of the quiz return to compete for a £20,000 prize, double the amount offered by the daytime show.

November
2 November 
As Channel 4 reaches its 18th birthday, a special edition of Countdown celebrates the show's 18th anniversary. Instead of the usual contestants, Gyles Brandreth and Mark Nyman take on Jo Brand and Damian Eadie in the letters and numbers quiz, while Richard Whiteley and Carol Vorderman recall their memories of the show's beginnings. 
Mother-of-two Kate Heusser becomes UK television's biggest female prize winner after winning £500,000 on ITV's Who Wants to Be a Millionaire?. Later that month, the show would have its first £1 million winner.
6–10 November – Channel 4 celebrates 18 years of Brookside with a run of five episodes over four nights in which viewers learn details of the demise of Susannah Morrisey (played by Karen Drury) through a series of flashbacks.
10 November – Channel 5 have commissioned a six-part run of Late Night with Jerry Springer, a new late-night chat show that will begin airing weekly from 22 November. Guests on the series will include Steven Berkoff, Louise Redknapp, Billie Piper, Dani Behr, Marc Almond and Fay Ripley.
13 November – BBC News reports that Russian state broadcaster RTR has bought the popular children's series Teletubbies, a programme unlike anything it has aired before.
15 November – ITV airs The Remorseful Day, the final episode of the Inspector Morse series.
16 November – Tony Blair's Chief of Communications Alastair Campbell tells political journalists that US-style televised election debates are virtually inevitable and that inter-party talks are under way to establish ground rules for such a debate, as long as the "chemistry" is right.
17 November 
BBC One airs the 2000 Children in Need telethon. By the following day, it has raised £12m for charity, surpassing the 1999 total of £11.2m.
FilmFour airs Gough Lewis's controversial 1999 documentary Sex: The Annabel Chong Story.
20 November – Judith Keppel becomes the first contestant to win £1 million on ITV's Who Wants to Be a Millionaire?. On the same evening, the final episode of the long-running sitcom One Foot in the Grave is shown on BBC One in the same timeslot. It is later speculated that Keppel's win was fixed so that ITV would draw ratings away from BBC One. However, the ITC clears Celador and ITV of the allegations.
23 November 
The BBC and ITV announce plans for two one-hour televised leaders debates during the run-up to the next General Election. Subject to the leaders of Britain's three main political parties agreeing to participate, a debate would be held by each broadcaster and chaired by David and Jonathan Dimbleby respectively. However, after Prime Minister Tony Blair declines to take part in January 2001, three separate question and answer sessions involving a single leader are held by each network during the 2001 election campaign.
Amanda Barrie who plays Alma Halliwell in Coronation Street announces her intention to leave the soap in Summer 2001.
28 November – Filming has begun on the new series of Crossroads, BBC News reports. The revived soap would begin airing on ITV in March 2001.
November – UK Play is renamed Play UK.

December
1 December – The BBC apologises to ITV for suggesting it rigged Judith Keppel's win on Who Wants to Be a Millionaire? as part of a ratings battle.
2 December – Nicola Kirsch wins the twelfth series of Stars in Their Eyes, performing as Maria Callas.
8 December 
SMG acquires a 14.9% stake in Scottish Radio Holdings. and four months later it increases its stake to 27.7%.
Coronation Street celebrates its 40th year on the air by broadcasting a live hour-long episode. The Prince of Wales (now Charles III) makes a cameo in the episode, appearing in a pre-recorded segment as himself in an ITV News bulletin report, presented by Trevor McDonald.
BBC One airs Freddie Mercury: The Untold Story, a documentary in which friends and relatives of Freddie Mercury recall their memories of the Queen frontman. 
9 December – Westlife's single My Love wins the 2000 Record of the Year, giving the Irish boyband their second win in a row.
10 December – Steve Redgrave is named as this year's BBC Sports Personality of the Year.
11 December 
BBC One airs a BBC News special, Prince William in Chile, showing footage of Prince William's charity expedition to Chilean Patagonia with Raleigh International. The prince was interviewed and filmed during the ten-week trip, with an interview released to the media on 10 December.
The Independent Television Commission criticises Channel 4's early evening scheduling of US TV series Angel, a drama about a reformed vampire which it says includes scenes "reminiscent of a late-night horror film". The channel aired edited episodes of the series in the early evening, but some viewers had complained it was inappropriate for children, while others had complained about the scenes being cut. The ITC felt that three of the edited episodes had still contained unsuitable matter for family viewing. The series has since been moved to a later time slot where it can be aired uncut.
12 December – Culture Secretary Chris Smith announces plans for the creation of the Office of Communications (Ofcom), a watchdog that would oversee the regulation of the UK broadcasting and telecommunications industries and take over responsibility from several current bodies, including the Broadcasting Standards Commission and Office of Telecommunications.
17 December – Can We Fix It?, the theme tune to the CBBC series Bob the Builder, tops the UK Singles Chart, becoming this year's Christmas number one.
18 December – The British Film Institute publishes its list of the 100 Greatest British Television Programmes of the 20th century. Compiled by a poll of industry professionals, Fawlty Towers tops the list, followed by Cathy Come Home and Doctor Who.
21 December – Channel 5's 12-part series X-Rated which includes reviews of pornographic films is criticised as unacceptable by the Independent Television Commission after it showed clips of an R18 film that can only be bought from specialist suppliers.
22 December – A contestant in the grand final of Series 29 of the Channel 4 quiz show Fifteen to One who cannot be identified for legal reasons, is edited out of the episode. The contestant, standing at position 4, is eliminated in the first round, having answered two questions incorrectly. The two questions are cut from the sequence, while the camera jumps from positions 3 to 5. From Round 2, the show continues as normal.
24 December – Channel Four shows the 1999 version of A Christmas Carol starring Patrick Stewart, Richard E. Grant and Dominic West.
25 December – BBC One airs the UK television premiere of Titanic, with overnight figures giving it an audience of 9.9 million. ITV has seven of the top ten most watched programmes of the day. Other popular Christmas Day shows include Coronation Street (ITV, 13.7m), EastEnders (BBC One, 12.1m) and Who Wants to Be a Millionaire? (ITV, 11.1m).
27 December 
BBC One airs a celebrity edition of Robot Wars, participants include Vic Reeves, Chris Eubank and boy band Five.
ITV airs Sinatra: Good Guy Bad Guy, a programme investigating Frank Sinatra's alleged links to the Mafia. The film was made without the permission of the Sinatra family and includes friends and colleagues discussing the late singer, some talking about him for the first time.

Debuts

BBC
1 January – Castaway 2000 (2000–2001)
4 January – 
The Ghost Hunter (2000–2002)
Murder Rooms: Mysteries of the Real Sherlock Holmes (2000–2001)
7 January – Yoho Ahoy (2000–2001)
9 January – Second Sight (2000–2001)
13 January – Beast (2000–2001)
17 January – Gormenghast (2000)
23 January – Clocking Off (2000–2003)
4 February – My Hero (2000–2006)
20 February – Hyperlinks (2000–2001)
23 February –
Hero to Zero (2000)
Child of Our Time (2000–present)
25 February – Perfect World (2000–2001)
27 February – Monarch of the Glen (2000–2005)
29 February – Blouse and Skirt (2000)
13 March – Bargain Hunt (2000–present)
15 March – Bruiser (2000)
16 March – Dirty Work (2000)
18 March – Randall & Hopkirk (2000–2001)
20 March – Techno Games (2000–2003)
26 March – Doctors (2000–present)
2 April – Deceit (2000)
3 April – 64 Zoo Lane (2000–2013)
6 April – L.A. 7 (2000)
7 April – Sheeep (2000–2001)
18 April – Madame Bovary (2000)
23 April – Football Fever (2000–2001)
27 April – The Big Impression (2000–2004)
30 April – Hearts and Bones (2000–2001)
2 May – Fish (2000)
11 May – Nice Girl (2000)
12 May – Coupling (2000–2004)
30 May – Liquid News (2000–2004)
1 June – Clarkson's Car Years (2000)
15 June –
McCready and Daughter (2000–2001)
Chambers (2000–2001)
25 June – Up Rising (2000)
26 June – The Syndicate (2000) 
27 June – A Many Splintered Thing (2000)
13 July – Head on Comedy (2000)
16 July – Border Cafe (2000)
22 July – I Love the '70s (2000)
24 July – Xchange (2000–2006)
25 July – Glasgow Kiss (2000)
7 August – Tinsel Town (2000–2001)
14 August – The Weakest Link (2000–2012, 2017–present)
27 August – Down to Earth (2000–2005)
4 September – Waking the Dead (2000–2011)
10 September – Other People's Children (2000)
11 September – A Likeness in Stone (2000)
19 September – My Family (2000–2011)
25 September –
The Magic Key (2000–2001)
S Club 7 Go Wild! (2000)
26 September – 
 Attachments (2000–2002)
 Marion and Geoff (2000–2003)
27 September – Big Kids (2000)
30 September – A History of Britain (2000–2002)
2 October – Breakfast (2000–present)
8 October – 
Care (2000)
Top of the Pops Plus (2000–2001)
12 October – The Lampies (2000–2001)
16 October – BBC News at Ten (2000–present)
20 October – Too Much Sun (2000)
24 October – The Sins (2000)
6 November – What the Romans Did for Us (2000)
13 November – Human Remains (2000)
15 November – State of the Planet (2000)
24 November – Conquistadors (2000)
26 November – Take a Girl Like You (2000)
26 December – The Sleeper (2000)
28 December – Donovan Quick (2000)

ITV (Including ITV and ITV2)
4 January –
Grizzly Tales for Gruesome Kids (2000–2006, 2011–2012)
Dog and Duck (2000–2003)
5 January –
Bomber (2000)
Meeow! (2000–2002)
7 January – Whatever I Want (2000)
10 January – 
Life Force (2000)
Little Grey Rabbit (2000–2001)
20 January – At Home with the Braithwaites (2000–2003)
21 January – 
 The Unforgettable (2000–2002, 2010–2012)
26 January – This Is Personal: The Hunt for the Yorkshire Ripper (2000)
10 March – The Baskervilles (2000)
12 March – Hero of the Hour (2000)
13 March –
Savage Planet (2000–2000s)
The Blind Date (2000)
26 March – The Last Musketeer (2000)
27 March – Monsignor Renard (2000)
2 April – Bob Martin (2000–2001)
23 April – The Railway Children (2000)
24 April – Cor, Blimey! (2000)
26 April – Rebus (2000–2007)
1 May – Metropolis (2000)
11 May – Harry and the Wrinklies (2000–2002)
17 May – Lady Audley's Secret (2000)
28 May – Baddiel and Skinner Unplanned (2000–2005)
7 June – The Coral Island (2000)
26 June – In Defence (2000)
6 July – Burnside (2000)
12 July – Pay and Display (2000)
15 August – The People Versus (2000–2002)
31 August – Safe As Houses (2000)
2 September – Lily Live! (2000–2001)
3 September – Anchor Me (2000)
7 September – Blind Ambition (2000)
17 September – My Fragile Heart (2000)
21 September – Preston Pig (2000)
24 September – Dirty Tricks (2000)
1 October – Lenny Blue (2000–2002) (also known as Tough Love)
2 October – Without Motive (2000–2001)
12 October – Fat Friends (2000–2005)
23 November – Close and True (2000)

Channel 4
13 January – That Peter Kay Thing (2000)
14 January – Trigger Happy TV (2000–2003)
1 March – A Place in the Sun (2000—present)
23 March – Jam / Jaaaaam (2000)
30 March – Da Ali G Show (2000–2004)
25 April – The Strange World of Michael Fry (2000)
9 May – 
Anna Karenina (2000)
Walter: The Secret Life of a Victorian Pornographer (2000)
29 May – Lock, Stock... (2000)
14 July – Big Brother (Channel 4: 2000–2010, Channel 5: 2011–2018)
23 September – Futurama (1999–2013)
29 September – Black Books (2000–2004)
30 September – The Kids from Room 402 (1999–2001)
18 October – North Square (2000)
29 October – Dogma TV (2000)
27 December – Mind Control (2000–2003)
Unknown – Stark Raving Mad (1999–2000)

Channel 5
17 May – Urban Gothic (2000–2001)
18 May – Ex-Rated (2000)
22 May – Animal Airport (2000)
6 June – Naked Jungle (2000)
11 September – The Wright Stuff (2000–present)
12 September – Jailbreak (2000)

Channels

New channels

Pay Defunct channels

Defunct channels

Television shows

Changes of network affiliation

Returning this year after a break of one year or longer
16 October – One Foot in the Grave (1990–1997, 2000)
30 October – Blockbusters (1983–93, 1994–95, 1997, 2000–01, 2012, 2019) 
17 November – Butterflies (1978–1983, 2000)

Ending this year
 Nine O'Clock News (1970–2000)
 Pingu (1986–2000, 2004–2006)
 Inspector Morse (1987–2000)
 Breakfast News (1989–2000)
 Mike and Angelo (1989–2000)
 One Foot in the Grave (1990–2000)
 Rosie and Jim (1990–2000)
 Gladiators (1992–2000, 2008–2009)
 One Foot in the Past (1993–2000)
 Mr. Motivator exercise routines (1993–2000)
 Can't Cook, Won't Cook (1995–2000)
 TFI Friday (1996–2000)
 dinnerladies (1998–2000)
 Heartburn Hotel (1998–2000)
 Sunburn (1999–2000)
 Hope and Glory (1999–2000)
 Queer as Folk (1999–2000)
 Insides Out (1999–2000)

Births
27 June – Ruben Reuter, actor 
29 June – Kia Pegg, actress 
5 October – Millie Innes, actress

Deaths

See also
 2000 in British music
 2000 in British radio
 2000 in the United Kingdom
 List of British films of 2000

References